RCP Design Global or RCP is an independent design agency based in Tours and Paris (France) founded by Régine Charvet-Pello in 1986. RCP is predominantly based in the transport and mobility design, and specialises in urban transport, High-speed rail, interiors, public spaces and street furniture. RCP is the French leader on sensory design.

History 
1986 : 
 Fondation of RCP Design Global
1996 : 
 Design Transport :Transilien for the SNCF - extern design
 Main contract with the RATP
2002 : 
 Design of the  Paris Tramway Line 3 for Alstom transport
2003 : 
 PREDIT Program with the SNCF - Direction de l’Innovation et de la Recherche
 Became the advertising agency of the château de Chenonceau
2004 : 
 Le Mans tramway design
 Fondation of Sensolab, sensory design department.
2006 : 
 Le Mans buses Design
 Angers tramway design
2007 : 
 Design in Algeria of Algiers tramway, Oran Tramway and Constantine Tramway for Alstom
 Design of the tram-train express line Rhônexpress (Lyon/Lyon-Saint Exupéry Airport) with Veolia Transport and Stadler Rail
2009 : 
 Tramway of Tours Design in association with Roger Tallon and Daniel Buren
 Wind turbine Design for Vergnet
2010 : 
 Tours buses Design
 Renovation of the SNCF TGV Sud-Est ; in association with Compin
 Seat concept for TGV - SNCF
2011 : 
 SUDI Design, Photovoltaics station with Groupe Hervé and Raphaël Dinelli

Awards 
RCP is most notable for the number of national and international design awards they have won over the years.

 2001 : Étoiles de l'Observeur du design 01 (see French Wikipedia article): « Jeux d'extérieur Gyrosat » - Proludic
 2004 : Lauréat Observeur du design 04 : « Jouet Manipuloo » - Nathan
 2006 : Lauréat Observeur du design 06 : « Tramway des Maréchaux à Paris » - RATP
 2006 : Lauréat Observeur du design 06 : « CYCLOTRI, borne interactive de la mallette pédagogique » - Haute-Garonne general council
 2007 : Grand Prix Cap’ Com / Prix coup de cœur : « Ciel en Arc » - Société d'Équipement de la Touraine
 2009 : Lauréat Observeur du design 09 : « Éole, le village du vent, aire de jeux pour enfants de 2 à 7 ans » - Wiki-cat and ADAPEI 79
 2009 : Lauréat Observeur du design 09 : « Exposition énergies » - SMEPE Haute-Garonne
 2009 : Lauréat Observeur du design 09 : « Birdlike, éolienne Farwind de 1MW » - Vergnet
 2011 : Lauréat Observeur du design 11 : « SMS, Sani Module System » - Sanitec
 2011 : Lauréat Observeur du design 11 : « Savebag, le book, cahier d’idées » - Savebag
 2011 : Lauréat Observeur du design 11 : « Chenonceau Store » - Château de Chenonceau
 2011 : Rolling stock price by French magazine « Ville, rail & transports » : « Moovi TER » - Brittany (administrative region)
 2011 : Rail d’Argent by French magazine « Ville, rail & transports » : « Intercités Normandie » - Région Haute-Normandie

Locations 
RCP Design Global
Head Office

56 avenue Marcel Dassault, 37200 Tours France

RCP Design Global
Paris Office

4 Place d'Estienne d'Orves, 75009 Paris France

See also 
Sensory design
Design

References

External links
  RCP Design Global official website
   RCP Design Global official blog

Streetcar designers
Service companies of France
Design companies established in 1986
Design companies of France
Wind turbine manufacturers
Engineering companies of France
Wind power in France
Sensory design
1986 establishments in France
Companies based in Centre-Val de Loire